Furtwängler is a German surname, originally meaning a person from Furtwangen. Notable people with the surname include:

 Adolf Furtwängler (1853–1907), archaeologist and art historian
 Maria Furtwängler (born 1966), physician and actress
 Philipp Furtwängler (1800-1867), organ builder
 Philipp Furtwängler (1869–1940), mathematician
 Wilhelm Furtwängler (1886–1954), conductor and composer

Also

 The Furtwängler Glacier, named for Walter Furtwängler

German-language surnames